Blue Élan Records is an independent record label based in Los Angeles, California. It was founded by entertainment and insurance lawyer Kirk Pasich, and his son, musician Connor Pasich, in 2014. Stylistically, the label's releases cover Alternative and Indie Rock, Americana, Folk, Blues, Hip Hop, and others. Their artist roster also ranges in age and industry history.

History
Kirk founded the label with his son, Connor, to release Cindy Alexander's sixth album, Curve. After contacting artist Cindy Alexander, whom Kirk had met during the production of StarTomorrow, about her recent cancer treatment, she invited him to visit her studio where she was recording her next album. Shortly after their meeting, the label was formed, and Curve released via Blue Élan Records in 2014.

Over the next four years, Blue Élan added Rita Coolidge, Janiva Magness, Jesse Dayton, Rod Melancon, and others to the roster, including Gerry Beckley and Rusty Young. The label gained further attention in 2017 when Janiva Magness earned a Best Contemporary Blues Album Grammy nomination for her Blue Élan release, Love Wins Again.

The label has partnered with the Alliance for Children's Rights on multiple occasions, a legal fund to help children in poverty access free services to legal aid.

Artists

 Amy Wilcox
Bob Gentry
 Boxing Gandhis
 Bryan Stephens
 Car Astor
 Chelsea Williams
 Cherie Currie & Brie Darling
 Cindy Alexander
 Colin Devlin
 Cory Branan
 Gina Sicilia
 Janiva Magness
 Jon Anderson
 Jesse Dayton
 Lisa Lambe
 Mint Trip
 Mustangs of the West
Natalie Gelman
Ozomatli
 Red Wanting Blue
Rod Gator
 Rita Coolidge
 Roan Yellowthorn
 Rusty Young
 The Rembrandts
Scout Durwood
 Soul Asylum
 The Vegabonds
 The Devlins

References

External links
 

Alternative rock record labels
Indie rock record labels
Record labels established in 2014
American independent record labels